The Second Woman (Spanish: La segunda mujer) is a 1953 Mexican drama film directed by José Díaz Morales and starring Rosa Carmina, Antonio Aguilar and Freddy Fernández.

Plot
A couple with preteen children breaks up. The husband (played by Antonio Aguilar) meets a new woman and they marry. As the children grow up, the film analyzes the impact of their parents' separation on their lives.

Cast

References

Bibliography 
 Pedro López García. Alicantinos en el cine. Cineastas en Alicante. Editorial Club Universitario, 2013.

External links 
 

1953 films
1953 drama films
Mexican drama films
1950s Spanish-language films
Films directed by José Díaz Morales
Mexican black-and-white films
1950s Mexican films